Cantikus is a genus of southeastern Asian cellar spiders first described by B. A. Huber, J. Eberle & D. Dimitrov in 2018.

Species
 it contains twenty-seven species:
Cantikus anaiensis (Yao & Li, 2016) — Indonesia (Sumatra)
Cantikus ballarini (Yao & Li, 2016) — Thailand
Cantikus cheni (Yao & Li, 2017) — Thailand
Cantikus chiangmaiensis (Yao & Li, 2016) — Thailand
Cantikus elongatus (Yin & Wang, 1981) — China, Laos
Cantikus erawan (Huber, 2011) — Thailand, Laos, Malaysia
Cantikus exceptus (Tong & Li, 2009) — China
Cantikus gou (Yao & Li, 2016) — Myanmar
Cantikus halabala (Huber, 2011) — Thailand to Singapore, Indonesia (Sumatra)
Cantikus khaolek (Huber, 2016) — Thailand
Cantikus kuhapimuk (Huber, 2016) — Thailand
Cantikus lintang (Huber, 2016) — Malaysia (Borneo)
Cantikus namou (Huber, 2011) — Laos
Cantikus pakse (Huber, 2011) — Laos
Cantikus phami (Yao, Pham & Li, 2015) — Vietnam
Cantikus pyu (Huber, 2011) — Myanmar
Cantikus sabah (Huber, 2011) — Malaysia (Borneo)
Cantikus sepaku (Huber, 2011) — Indonesia (Borneo)
Cantikus subwan (Yao & Li, 2017) — Thailand
Cantikus sudhami (Huber, 2011) — Thailand
Cantikus taptaoensis (Yao & Li, 2016) — Thailand
Cantikus tharnlodensis (Yao & Li, 2016) — Thailand
Cantikus ubin (Huber, 2016) — Singapore, Indonesia (Gaya Is.)
Cantikus v-notatus (Thorell, 1878) — Myanmar to Indonesia
Cantikus wan (Yao & Li, 2016) — Thailand
Cantikus youngae (Huber, 2011) — Thailand
Cantikus zhuchuandiani (Yao & Li, 2016) — Indonesia (Borneo)

References

External links

Araneomorphae genera
Pholcidae